Dimmick is an unincorporated community in LaSalle County, Illinois located  northeast of Peru in Dimmick Township. In recent years, it has increased in population, with the construction of the small "Dimmick Fields" subdivision.

History

The town was named for its founder, Daniel Dimmick, who emigrated here from Mansfield, CT by way of Hennepin, IL in 1833. The railroad was extended to Dimmick ca. 1865 by the Illinois Central Railroad.
In 1873, a rail depot was constructed to replace an earlier one that had fallen into disrepair and the town was platted. By 1876, the town was home to 3 stores and a blacksmith. A post office was established at Dimmick in 1877, and remained in operation until 1912. Passenger service continued until the early 1930s before being discontinued.

References

Unincorporated communities in LaSalle County, Illinois
Unincorporated communities in Illinois
Ottawa, IL Micropolitan Statistical Area
1850 establishments in Illinois